Alberto Santos-Dumont was a Brazilian aviation pioneer

Santos-Dumont may also refer to:
Santos-Dumont Airport - second major airport serving Rio de Janeiro, Brazil
Santos Dumont, Minas Gerais - a municipality in southern Minas Gerais state, Brazil
Santos-Dumont (crater) - small lunar impact crater
Rodovia Santos Dumont - a highway in the state of São Paulo, Brazil
Santos Dumont (miniseries)

See also